Naomi Osaka defeated Victoria Azarenka in the final, 1–6, 6–3, 6–3 to win the women's singles tennis title at the 2020 US Open. It was her second US Open title and third major title overall. Osaka became the first player from an Asian country (excluding Russia) to win three major singles titles, the first player since Jennifer Capriati to win three such titles in three attempts and, at 22 years of age, the youngest player to win three major titles since Maria Sharapova at the 2008 Australian Open. Azarenka, who was in her first major final since the 2013 US Open, was aiming to become the first mother to win a major singles title since Kim Clijsters won the 2011 Australian Open.

Bianca Andreescu was the reigning champion, but withdrew before the tournament due to travel concerns caused by the ongoing COVID-19 pandemic. Citing safety reasons, five other top-ten players (including reigning major champions Ashleigh Barty and Simona Halep) also withdrew from the event. In all, 24 players ranked inside the top 100 were absent from the tournament. The absences of Barty and Halep, respectively world No. 1 and 2, made this the first major since the 2004 Wimbledon Championships not to feature either of the world's top two ranked players.

29 of the 32 seeded women progressed to the second round; the most since the US Open changed from 16 seeds to 32 seeds in 2001.

With her first round win over Kristie Ahn, Serena Williams surpassed Chris Evert for the most match wins (102) in US Open history. Williams was attempting to equal Margaret Court's all-time record of 24 major singles titles and was also trying to set a new Open Era record by winning a seventh US Open singles title, but lost to Azarenka in the semifinals. Williams became the first player in history to reach a major semifinal in four decades: the 1990s, 2000s, 2010s and 2020s. With Williams, Azarenka and Tsvetana Pironkova in the quarterfinals, it marked the first time in major history that three mothers did so. The semifinal between Williams and Azarenka was the first semifinal between two mothers in major history. This was Kim Clijsters' first (and only) major appearance since the 2012 US Open, due to her return to the sport in February 2020. Clijsters was awarded a wildcard into the main draw, but she lost to Ekaterina Alexandrova in three sets, and would retire from tennis once again in 2022.

There were no qualifiers this year. The WTA rankings valid on August 3 (also being the rankings from March 16) were used to determine the main-draw entry list.

Seeds
Seeding per WTA rankings.

Draw

Finals

Top half

Section 1

Section 2

Section 3

Section 4

Bottom half

Section 5

Section 6

Section 7

Section 8

Other entry information

Wild cards

Protected ranking

Alternates
  Asia Muhammad
  Arina Rodionova

Withdrawals

 – not included on entry list& – withdrew from entry list
Notes

Championship match statistics

References

External links
2020 US Open – Women's draws and results at the International Tennis Federation

Women's Singles
US Open – Women's singles
US Open (tennis) by year – Women's singles
2020 in women's tennis
2020 in American women's sports